Levon Helm is a 1978 album by Levon Helm. It was Helm's second studio album independent of the Band.

Track listing
"Ain't No Way to Forget You" (Carroll Quillen, Grady Smith)
"Driving at Night" (Daniel Moore)
"Play Something Sweet" (Allen Toussaint)
"Sweet Johanna" (Johanna Hall, John Hall)
"I Came Here to Party" (Tony Joe White)
"Take Me to the River" (Al Green, Teenie Hodges)
"Standing on a Mountaintop" (Earl Cate, Ernie Cate)
"Let's Do It in Slow Motion" (Benny Latimore)
"Audience for My Pain" (Gerry Goffin, Barry Goldberg)

Personnel
Levon Helm – vocals
Dan Ferguson, Jimmy Johnson, Larry Byrom – guitar
Steve Cropper – guitar, percussion
David Hood, Scott Edwards – bass
Barry Beckett, Randy McCormick – keyboards
Roger Hawkins, Willie Hall – drums
Lou Marini – tenor and alto saxophone
Alan Rubin – trumpet
Tom Malone – trombone, horn arrangements
Earl Cate, Ernie Cate, Mary Berry – backing vocals

References

1978 albums
Levon Helm albums
Albums produced by Donald "Duck" Dunn
Albums recorded at Muscle Shoals Sound Studio
ABC Records albums